is a Japanese footballer who currently plays for Fukushima United from 2023.

Career

Club
On 23 July 2017, Nagoya Grampus announced that Kobayashi had joined Vegalta Sendai on loan until 31 January 2018.

On 28 December 2022, Shonan Bellmare announcement that Kobayashi had joined to J3 club, Fukushima United for upcoming 2023 season.

Career statistics

Club
.

References

External links
Profile at Vegalta Sendai
Profile at Nagoya Grampus

1991 births
Living people
People from Minamiashigara, Kanagawa
Association football people from Kanagawa Prefecture
Japanese footballers
J1 League players
J2 League players
J3 League players
Shonan Bellmare players
Thespakusatsu Gunma players
Nagoya Grampus players
Vegalta Sendai players
Fukushima United FC players
Association football defenders